Gustafs skål, is a song written by Carl Michael Bellman as a salutation to Gustav III of Sweden, following the coup d'état of 1772, which made himself an autocrat and ended the parliamentary age of liberty. The king very much liked the song and informally it came to function as his royal anthem.

Lyrics

See also
Bevare Gud vår kung
Kungssången

References

External links
 Bo Lund  - Gustafs skål MP3

Royal anthems
European anthems
Cultural depictions of Gustav III